Carpen is a commune in Dolj County, Oltenia, Romania with a population of 2,953 people. It is composed of three villages: Carpen, Cleanov and Geblești.

References

Communes in Dolj County
Localities in Oltenia